Muriel Aked (9 November 1883 – 21 March 1955) was an English film actress.

Early life, family and education
Aked was born in Bingley, West Riding of Yorkshire, England to George Henry Aked and his wife Emma (née Bairstow).

She was a student at Liverpool Repertory Theatre for six months but due to World War I left to perform war work.

Career
Aked made her screen debut in 1920 in A Sister to Assist 'Er. She also appeared in Can You Hear Me, Mother?, Public Nuisance No.1, Autumn Crocus (1934), Royal Eagle, Fame and Don't Rush Me.

Filmography

Film

Television

References

External links

1880s births
1955 deaths
English film actresses
Actresses from Yorkshire
People from Bingley
20th-century English actresses
British comedy actresses